The third of three 1949 Buenos Aires Grand Prix (official name: IV Gran Premio del General Juan Perón y de la Ciudad de Buenos Aires), was a Grand Prix motor race held at the Palermo street circuit in Buenos Aires on December 18, 1949.

Classification

References

Buenos Aires Grand Prix (III)
Buenos Aires Grand Prix (III)
Buenos Aires Grand Prix